Nathan Gregory Moore (born April 8, 1983) is a retired American mixed martial artist. A professional from 2006 until 2013, he competed for Strikeforce.

Background
Born and raised in Indianapolis, Indiana, Moore was a two-time state wrestling champion, a Junior National Freestyle Wrestling Champion, and also received All-State honors in football while attending Perry Meridian High School. Moore then attended Purdue University where he continued his wrestling career and was the team's captain. Moore also competed in the Greco-Roman category at Purdue.

Mixed martial arts career

Early career
Moore compiled a professional record of 6-1 before being signed by Strikeforce.

Strikeforce
Moore made his debut for Strikeforce in 2009, defeating Louis Taylor via submission due to punches in the second round. Moore returned to Strikeforce only to lose to future Welterweight Champion Tarec Saffiedine at Strikeforce Challengers: Lindland vs. Casey via second-round knockout.

His next fight for the promotion was scheduled to be against Nathan Coy at Strikeforce: Woodley vs. Saffiedine. The fight instead took place at Strikeforce: Diaz vs. Cyborg which Moore won via KO in the second round.

Moore's next fight was against Jason High on July 14, 2012 at Strikeforce: Rockhold vs. Kennedy. He lost the fight via guillotine choke submission in the first round.

Independent Promotions
Moore most recently competed at MMA Xtreme: Fists will Fly on August 24, 2013 and lost via unanimous decision.

Personal life
Moore is the founder of Combat Circuit  located at American Kickboxing Academy.

Film and television
Moore was featured in the award-winning mixed martial arts documentary Fight Life, the film is directed by James Z. Feng and released in 2013.

Mixed martial arts record

|-
| Loss
| align=center| 8–4
| Dominique Steele
| Decision (unanimous) 
| MMA Xtreme: Fists will Fly
| 
| align=center| 3
| align=center| 5:00
| Evansville, Indiana, United States
| 
|-
| Loss
| align=center| 8–3
| Jason High
| Submission (guillotine choke)
| Strikeforce: Rockhold vs. Kennedy
| 
| align=center| 1
| align=center| 0:26
| Portland, Oregon, United States
| 
|-
| Win
| align=center| 8–2
| Nathan Coy
| KO (punches)
| Strikeforce: Diaz vs. Cyborg
| 
| align=center| 2
| align=center| 0:25
| San Jose, California, United States
| 
|-
| Loss
| align=center| 7–2
| Tarec Saffiedine
| KO (punch)
| Strikeforce Challengers: Lindland vs. Casey
| 
| align=center| 2
| align=center| 1:21
| Portland, Oregon, United States
| 
|-
| Win
| align=center| 7–1
| Louis Taylor
| TKO (submission to punches)
| Strikeforce: Fedor vs. Rogers
| 
| align=center| 2
| align=center| 3:24
| Hoffman Estates, Illinois, United States
| 
|-
| Win
| align=center| 6–1
| Charles Dera
| Submission (armbar)
| Pryme Time Promotions: Riot at the Hyatt
| 
| align=center| 1
| align=center| 2:48
| Westlake Village, California, United States
| 
|-
| Loss
| align=center| 5–1
| Waylon Kennell
| KO (knee)
| Unleashed Fight
| 
| align=center| 1
| align=center| 0:17
| Alpine, California, United States
| 
|-
| Win
| align=center| 5–0
| Kurt Osiander
| KO (punch)
| GC 80: Summer Showdown
| 
| align=center| 1
| align=center| 0:06
| San Francisco, California, United States
| 
|-
| Win
| align=center| 4–0
| Elario Moreno
| TKO (punches)
| GC 75: Erin-Go-Brawl
| 
| align=center| 1
| align=center| 1:25
| San Francisco, California, United States
| 
|-
| Win
| align=center| 3–0
| Ricco Talamantes
| Submission (armbar)
| United Fight League
| 
| align=center| 1
| align=center| 1:10
| Indianapolis, Indiana, United States
| 
|-
| Win
| align=center| 2–0
| Rashad Dragon
| TKO (submission to punches)
| FightFest: Black and Blues Tour
| 
| align=center| 1
| align=center| 4:07
| Cleveland, Ohio, United States
| 
|-
| Win
| align=center| 1–0
| John Troyer
| Decision (unanimous)
| United Fight League 2
| 
| align=center| 3
| align=center| 5:00
| Indianapolis, Indiana, United States
|

Amateur Record

References

External links

Professional MMA Record from Sherdog.com

Living people
American male mixed martial artists
Mixed martial artists from California
Welterweight mixed martial artists
Mixed martial artists utilizing collegiate wrestling
Mixed martial artists utilizing freestyle wrestling
Mixed martial artists utilizing Greco-Roman wrestling
1983 births